Kickers is a youth brand created in 1970 in France that produces a wide range of footwear and clothing. Kickers was bought in 2007 by the Royer group.

Kickers are primarily popular amongst British school children, with Kickers 'Lo' style shoes being a popular choice of school shoes for British boys attending secondary school.

History 
 
On the French scene in 1970, Daniel Raufast came across a poster advertising the musical Hair. Interested by all the barefooted youngsters wearing jeans, he developed a new shoe concept which he believed to be more compatible with the blue-jean generation. The designer Jacques Chevallereau then created the first 'jean boot'. This new shoe was very different: the use of nubuck; shapes that looked more like short boots than regular shoes; tough crepe soles made with natural rubber, eyelets, contrast stitching, panels and appliqués all obviously referencing denim. The success was such that, within one season, Kickers production capacity grew from 300 to 12,000 pairs per month. Immediately successful in France, then Germany, by 1974, Kickers were selling in over 70 countries.

United Kingdom 

During the 1980s Kickers shoes became very successful in Britain. So much so in some case, children were queuing up until 10 o'clock at night waiting upon deliveries, and when the delivery did arrive the stock would be gone in a flash. Many children also collected the flower shape tag and did not believe the shoes were real Kickers unless this tag was included.

School shoes
A variety of Kickers shoes, primarily the Lo and Hi top styles, have proven to be popular amongst British school children, mostly boys attending secondary school, as use of school shoes.

Kick Hi 
The Kick Hi boot was released in 1975.

Music industry popularity 
It was in the late 1980s and early 1990s that Kickers really gained popularity when Kick His were heralded by icons on the Manchester music scene. The Kick Hi then became popular in the rave scene, first with acid house and then later with trance music. Many fans of the shoe came from diverse and contemporary musical backgrounds including UK garage, RnB, pop and hip hop.

In popular culture 

Over the years, Kickers has been associated with the music industry, including Ms Dynamite, So Solid Crew, Jarvis Cocker, Noel Gallagher, Mike Skinner, Arctic Monkeys, Craig David and Rodney P. 

David Bowie wore a pair of Kickers on the set of Peace on Earth/Little Drummer Boy alongside Bing Crosby in 1977. He was also photographed by Clive Arrowsmith in that same year, as well as appearing on the front cover of Melody Maker on February 18, 1978, resplendent in the brand.

Ian Brown wore a pair of Kick His to The Haçienda as a cheeky retort to the strict 'no trainer policy'. The Stone Roses wore them in their video for 'Fools Gold'. A sheep sported a pair of Kick His on the cover of the 'Stepping Stone' 12-inch single by The Farm.

Kickers sponsored the Urban Music Awards (UMA) 2007 and had an advertorial with NME which ended in September 2007.

References

External links 
 
 Arte
 Blog
 French dressing

Clothing companies of France
Clothing companies established in 1970
Shoe brands
Shoe companies of France
Sportswear brands
1970 establishments in France